Sherkat-e Margh Tak (also Romanized as Sherkat-e Margh Taḵ; also known as Sherkat-e Morghak) is a village in Kuhpayeh-e Gharbi Rural District, in the Central District of Abyek County, Qazvin Province, Iran. At the 2006 census, its population was 62, in 16 families.

References 

Populated places in Abyek County